Metasia capnochroa is a species of moth of the family Crambidae described by Edward Meyrick in 1884. It is found in Australia, where it has been recorded from New South Wales, South Australia and Tasmania.

References

Moths described in 1884
Moths of Australia
Metasia